An organ scholar is a young musician employed as a part-time assistant organist at a cathedral, church or institution where regular choral services are held.  The idea of an organ scholarship is to provide the holder with playing, directing and administrative experience. It is an important part of music-making in Christian worship and is strongly associated with, but is not limited to, Anglican church music in the United Kingdom, Australia and the USA.

Organ scholars may sometimes be found at a cathedral or a collegiate church. Many colleges at Oxford, Cambridge and Dublin universities, as well as other universities, offer organ scholarships to undergraduates. At some institutions (for example, Christ Church, Oxford, New College, Oxford, Trinity College, Dublin or King's College, Cambridge), the organ scholar(s) work under the direction of a full-time professional director of music.  At other institutions, the organ scholar is in charge of running the choir.

One of the first organ scholarships in the University of Cambridge was set up by Queens' College, Cambridge. An early scholar there was the composer Charles Villiers Stanford, who took up his position there in 1870.

Many organ scholars have gone on to notable careers in music and in other fields. Two notable ex-organ scholars who went on to achieve fame in other fields are Edward Heath, who read Philosophy, Politics, and Economics at Balliol College, Oxford and later served as British Prime Minister 1970–1974; and Dudley Moore, who read music at Magdalen College, Oxford and went on to a career in acting.

Notable organ scholars at universities and colleges

References 

Organists